A quasi-star (also called black hole star) is a hypothetical type of extremely massive and luminous star that may have existed early in the history of the Universe. Unlike modern stars, which are powered by nuclear fusion in their cores, a quasi-star's energy would come from material falling into a black hole at its core.

Formation and properties 

A quasi-star would result from the core of a large protostar collapsing into a black hole, where the outer layers of the protostar are massive enough to absorb the resulting burst of energy without being blown away or falling into the black hole, as occurs with modern supernovae. Such a star would have to be at least . Quasi-stars may have also formed from dark matter halos drawing in enormous amounts of gas via gravity, which can produce supermassive stars with tens of thousands of solar masses. Formation of quasi-stars could only happen early in the development of the Universe, before hydrogen and helium were contaminated by heavier elements; thus, they may have been very massive Population III stars. Such stars would dwarf VY Canis Majoris and Stephenson 2 DFK 1, both among the largest known modern stars, in size.

Once the black hole had formed at the core of the protostar, it would continue generating a large amount of radiant energy from the infall of stellar material. This constant outburst of energy would counteract the force of gravity, creating an equilibrium similar to the one that supports modern fusion-based stars. These intermediate-mass black holes have been suggested as the progenitors of modern supermassive black holes.

This limiting temperature would mark the end of the quasi-star's life, since there is no hydrostatic equilibrium at or below this limiting temperature. The object would then quickly dissipate, leaving behind the intermediate mass black hole.

See also 
 Accretion
 Accretion disk
 Blitzar
 Thorne–Żytkow object
 Neutron star

References 

Black holes
Star types
Hypothetical stars